Huangmaojian is a  mountain in Longquan County in southwest of Zhejiang province in eastern China. The mountain is the highest peak of Zhejiang and part of the Wuyi Mountains that have their bulk in Fujian province. Huangmaojian is an ultra prominent peak. The mountain is located within the Fengyangshan–Baishanzu National Nature Reserve.

See also 
 List of Ultras of Tibet, East Asia and neighbouring areas

References 

Mountains of Zhejiang
Highest points of Chinese provinces
Lishui